Zahid Shareef (born 11 October 1967) is a former Pakistani international hockey player who represented Pakistan  from 1987 to 1991. During his playing career, he scored 41 goals playing in 73 matches. He is remembered for his exceptional dribbling skill. He was banned from the game in a controversial manner for six months. He retired from hockey in 1991. In February 2015, Shareef, who was working as a shift station manager at Allama Iqbal International Airport in Lahore, was arrested for alleged drugs smuggling.

Early life
Born in Chauburji Rajgarh, Lahore, Shareef developed a keen interest in sports, especially hockey. He has an elder brother and two younger siblings. Known for his dribbling skill, pinpoint passing and acceleration, he represented MAO College, where he caught the attention of the PHF scouts.

Career
Shareef represented Pakistan in Junior Hockey World Cup in 1984 in Canada, where his performance went unnoticed; however, he quickly climbed ranks in the Pakistan Hockey Squad. In 1987, after Holland defeated Pakistan in first two of the five-match series, the Dutch lost to National Bank of Pakistan, in which Sharif was instrumental and led to inclusion in Pakistan squad. His consistent performance in 1988 Champions Trophy, in which Pakistan won Silver Medal, led to his selection for the 1988 Seoul Olympics, in which Pakistan finished fifth, leading to a public backlash. The Pakistan team, including Shareef, won a series against India and the Indira Gandhi Gold Cup held in India in 1989. Known for his hot-tempered persona on the field, he was banned for six months from every sort of hockey when he misbehaved with a referee. He was unable to make a comeback in international sport.

Playing style
Shareef was an attacking player, mostly playing either as centre-forward or inside left. He was known for his dribbling skill and clinical finishing. He also had good passing sense with superb acceleration. Throughout his career, he wore shirt number 10 and 16 although his favorite shirt was number 10.

Arrest
On 8 February 2015, while working as a shift station manager at Lahore's Allama Iqbal International Airport, Pakistan's Anti Narcotics Force (ANF) arrested Shareef for alleged drug smuggling. It was alleged he had gone to the airport to hand over a bag containing heroin to a passenger who was bound for Doha.

References

Living people
1963 births
Pakistani male field hockey players
Field hockey players at the 1990 Asian Games
Asian Games medalists in field hockey
Asian Games gold medalists for Pakistan
Medalists at the 1990 Asian Games